Isochariesthes breuningi is a species of beetle in the family Cerambycidae. It was described by E. Forrest Gilmour in 1954.

References

breuningi
Beetles described in 1954